Teapot Island is a teapot museum in Kent, England. The museum grew from the personal teapot collection of owner Sue Blazye, which started when her grandmother gave her a teapot in 1983, encouraging other family members and friends to do the same. The growth of her collection eventually led to her needing a larger space to house it, and she established Teapot Island in Yalding, in November 2002. The building used for the collection used to be a cafe called the Riverside Diner, which had been in operation since the 1950s. The collection has been valued at £15,000.

Teapot Island was featured in the Guinness Book of World Records in 2004, for being the largest collection of teapots. The museum lost this title in 2011, when it was awarded to a man in China with a collection of 30,000. In 2011, the museum was featured in the book Crap Days Out, in which the authors stated: "It's awful if you don't like teapots. But it's probably all right if you do."

References

External links

Museums in the Borough of Maidstone
Museums established in 2002
2002 establishments in England
Decorative arts museums in England
Teapots